Woo Mi-hwa (February 2, 1974) is a South Korean actress. She began her career as actress in theater, then transitioned to supporting roles on television and film. She debuted as theater actress in 1998 with role Petra in Korean adaptation of play An Enemy of the People.

Woo has performed in over 60 theatre productions. Some of her stage roles during that period were in acclaimed revivals of Three Sisters and Dear Elena.  She has received prestigious theater acting awards, including the 2011 Seoul Theater Festival Female Acting Award and Best Actress of the 2011 Korea Acting Awards for Blowing Songs Flowers in the Rain, Best Actress of the 2013 Korean Drama Awards for Three Sisters, and the 2017 SACA Best Actress Award for her portrayal of Elena in Lyudmila Razumovskaya Dear Elena.

She has appeared in supporting roles in various films and television dramas. Her first notable supporting role in television was from drama series Life (2018). In the same year, Woo's other works were Sky Castle (2018), Doctor Prisoner (2018), and Black Dog: Being A Teacher (2018). Before she started acting in crime drama Voice Season 4 (2020), She signed with her current agency D-plan Entertainment. Her most known role in television series is Lee Myung-shin, Hye-jin's step mother from Hometown Cha-Cha-Cha (2021).

Early life and education 
Born on February 2, 1974, into a mining family in Hambaek, a village near Yeongwol, Gangwon-do, Woo was brought up in her hometown ever since. When She attended high school, due to the dying fate of mining industry, Woo's father forced to move to Seoul to find work. Soon after Woo's older sister followed. Woo finally transferred to Boseong Girls High School in Namsan, Seoul and stayed with her sister while waiting for her mother who need to wrap up everything in their hometown before moving to the city.

After graduated from high school. Woo enrolled to Departement of German Literature of Sookmyung Women's University. Departement of German Literature had yearly tradition to perform German translation play onstage. During a summer vacation, Woo took a play reading class and play production, then accidentally selected as an actress. Somehow a shy country girl who always find it hard to adapt to Seoul's lifestyle found acting interesting and decided to pursue the path. After Woo graduated with bachelor degree in German Literature, Woo transferred to Dongguk University's Department of Theater and Film.

Career

1998-2000: Theater debut 
She passed the audition Seoul Theater Company and became a trainee member. In 1998, Woo debut as actress in role Petra in Korean adaptation of play An Enemy of the People by playwright Henrik Ibsen For a young 24 years-old rookie actress Woo, passing the audition was quite unexpected. Added the fact that this was a highly anticipated play, directed by Kim Seok-man and led by two solid actors, Lee Ho-jae as doctor Thomas Stokeman and Yoon Joo-sang as his older brother, Mayor Peter Stokeman. Both actors were winner of the prestigious Lee Hae-rang Theater Award; Lee Ho-jae in 1994 and Yoon Joo-sang in 1995. This project were their acting showdown on the same stage for the first time in 20 years, since their last work together in Shakespeare's As You Like It. Hence this experience is unforgettable memory for Woo.

Another Woo project with Seoul Theater Company, was MBC Family Musical Lulu and the Twelve Fairies – A Beautiful Winter Story (1999). In the musical that was broadcast by television network MBC, Woo took on dual roles, rabbit and Fairy of August.

2001-2014: Yeonwoo Theater Company and Iru Theater Company 
From 2001 to 2004, Woo Mi-hwa was member of Yeonwoo Theater Company (Yeonwoo Mudae). She participated in over ten of their stage productions, which included their famous plays Lee (2001) Korean Wooturi (2002) and That Guy Looks Like a Radish (2003).

In 2004, former Yeonwoo member, Son Ki-ho establised Theater Company Iru (극단 이루). Woo and fellow actress Yeom Hye-ran joined him as founding members. With Son Ki-ho, Woo earned recognition as actress in Daehangno. Their notable work together was play Blowing Songs Flowers in the Rain that was premiered in 2010 and had several encore performances due to its popularity. In 2010 it won two awards, 2010 Jeon Mun-yeon Drama Competition Winner and 2010 Myeongdong Arts Theater Creative Factory. In 2011 Seoul Theater Festival, it won four awards, Grand Prize, Male Acting Award, Female Acting Award and Popularity Award. Woo also won Female Acting Award in 2011 Korean Drama Awards for her role. Her costar, won Male Actor Award in 2011 Dong-A Theater Award.

In 2013, Woo performed with Kim Ji-won, and Jang Ji-a, playing the title role of Olga in Korean adaptation of in Anton Chekhov play Three Sisters. Directed by Moon Sam-hwa, the play was presented in the stage of the Seoul Arts Center's Free Small Theater. For her performance as Olga, Woo received Best Actress of the 2013 Korean Drama Awards.

In 2008, 2009, and 2010, Woo appeared in "The people who lived in Gampo, Deok-yi, and Yeol-soo" and established herself as a charismatic actress. In 2010, she made her presence known by appearing in the 6th Women's Director's Fair "Fighting Women" and "Who else said we would be like us?".

In 2009, Woo acted in preview performance of Korean adaptation of play "We Love Too Much To Meet Everyday". It was adapted from French play "On s’aimait trop pour se voir tous les jours" written by playwright Guy Alloucherie.

2015-present: Television debut 
Woo ventured to television without any special reason. As there are many theater actors who do movies and dramas, she was given chance to do minor roles. Her first role was female tailor in drama series Heard It Through the Grapevine (2015). The following year, she returned to theater for Kim Kwang-rim's 1996 stage play encore Come see me (2016). The National Theater production is loosely based on the true story of Korea's first confirmed serial murders, which took place between 1986 and 1991 in Hwaseong, Gyeonggi Province, in which Woo played Park Gi-ja.

In 2017, she played the title role of Elena in Dear Elena, Oh In-ha's Korean adaptation of Dorogaya Yelena Sergeyevna, an eponymous play by Lyudmila Razumovskaya, for which she won the 2017 SACA Best Actress Award.

In the same year, Woo joined late Kim Dong-hyun memorial performance, the play 'Are you okay?' that were performed at Doosan Art Center Space 111. Woo acted with Seong Yeo-jin and Jeon Park-chan. Kim Dong-hyun was founder of the Theater troupe Elephant Manbo. Despite his absence, his coleagues still celebrating its 10th anniversary of his Theater troupe. Even though Woo is a member of the troupe Iru, but she also has been active in Theater Elephant Manbo.

In 2018, Woo was cast in theater play Warrior of Sunshine. In the same year, Woo took on few television minor roles. Most notable one was Do-hoon’s Mom in JTBC hit drama Sky Castle, where Woo acted as mother who flirts with Han Seo-jin (Yeom Jeong-ah) for her son education. In the same year, Woo finally landed her first supporting role in television series, as gynecologist Kim Jung-hee in drama Life. Woo said, "It was the first time that a name was created and I was able to talk about the thoughts and values of the name. "I was so grateful," Woo said, expressing her affection for the character.

In 2019, Woo and Seo Yi-sook were double cast as Nora; and Son Jong-hak and Park Ho-san were double cast as Torwald in Korean adaptation of play A Doll's House Part 2 by American playwright Lucas Hnath. The original play was released in 2017, written as the “sequel” of Henrik Ibsen's masterpiece A Doll's House, premiered in December 1879. In A Doll's House, main character Nora Helmer, a mother of three and wife of Torvald, is living out the ideal of the 19th-century wife, but leaves her family at the end. In A Doll's House Part 2, set in 1894, Nora Helmer, who already became successful writer, back after 15 years to file for her divorce.

Woo made her feature film debut in 2020 as the titular character in Han Jae-yi's melodrama Ivy. It follows the life of Eun-soo and Ye-won, a lesbian couple who suddenly had to take care Eun-soo's niece Su-min, who lost her mother in a sudden accident. Also that year, she appeared as Dr. Livingstone, the psychiatrist, in the Seoul Art Center adaption of John Pielmeier's play Agnes of God.

In March 2021, Woo was offered the role Anita in the MPN Company play Vincent River, adaption of Philip Ridley's play, directed by Shin Yoo-cheong. Anita is mother who lost her gay son Vincent overnight in a homophobic assault and murder case. The storyline is focused on conversation between Anita and Davy, who hovers around Anita. This play discuss issues of homophobia, crimes caused by that hate, and discriminatory views. The play was the second collaboration between MPN Company and Ateod, which aimed to revitalize the Daehangno performance market and create a stable production environment. It was performed for the first time in Korea in April 2021. Woo reprised her role as Anita in 2022.

In 2021, Woo starred alongside Song Kang-ho in Han Jae-rim's film Emergency Declaration.

Personal life 
Woo Mi-wha is nicknamed "Woo-bosal" a portmanteau of her surname and short term of righteous Bodhisattva by her theater friends due to her calm demeanor and her personality who always lend ears if her junior actors need advice. 

Woo met her husband Yoon Jeong-hwan, fellow actor, theater director and producer, when they were both students at Dongguk University's Department of Theater and Film. They dated for more than 10 years and finally married in 2006.

Filmography

Film

Television drama

Web drama

Television show

Stage

Musical

Theater

Discography

Awards

Notes

References

External links 

 
 
  
 Woo Mi-hwa at Daum Encyclopedia 
 Woo Mi-hwa at Daum Movie 
 Woo Mi-hwa at PlayDB 

Living people
People from Gangwon Province, South Korea
1974 births
South Korean film actresses
South Korean musical theatre actresses
South Korean stage actresses
South Korean television actresses
20th-century South Korean actresses
21st-century South Korean actresses